Sharifabad (also Romanized as Sharīfābād) is a village in Yazdanabad Rural District, Yazdanabad District, Zarand County, Kerman Province, Iran. At the 2006 census, its population was 101, in 27 families.

References 

Populated places in Zarand County